This is a list of German television related events from 1965.

Events
27 February - Ulla Wiesner is selected to represent Germany at the 1965 Eurovision Song Contest with her song "Paradies, wo bist du?". She is selected to be the tenth German Eurovision entry during Ein Lied für Neapel held at the NDR in Hamburg.

Debuts

ARD
 9 May – Die Unverbesserlichen (1965–1971)
 25 September - Beat-Club (1965-1972)

Television shows

1950s
Tagesschau (1952–present)

1960s
 heute (1963-present)

Ending this year

Births
7 September - Jörg Pilawa, TV host
21 December - Anke Engelke, Canadian-born comedian & actress

Deaths